The Ranfjorden (or just Ranfjord) is a fjord in the Helgeland district of Nordland county, Norway. The largest part of the fjord is in the municipality of Rana, but the fjord also passes through the municipalities of Hemnes, Vefsn, Leirfjord, Nesna, and Dønna. The Ranelva river meets the Ranfjord in at the town of Mo i Rana at the innermost part of the fjord.

The inner part of the fjord is lush, forested, and more heavily populated. The western parts of the fjord are narrow with steep sides and that area has few inhabitants. There is a narrow strait that connects to the Sørfjorden and Elsfjorden at the village of Hemnesberget. Two large rivers flow into the fjord: Ranelva and Røssåga. The European route E6 highway follows the part of the southern coast of the fjord on its way to Mo i Rana.

Gallery

References

Fjords of Nordland
Rana, Norway
Hemnes
Vefsn
Leirfjord
Nesna
Dønna